Georgius Rex Imperator is a Royal and Imperial Cypher of:

George V of the United Kingdom
George VI of the United Kingdom